The mackerel, tuna, and bonito family, Scombridae, includes many of the most important and familiar food fishes. The family consists of 51 species in 15 genera and two subfamilies. All species are in the subfamily Scombrinae, except the butterfly kingfish, which is the sole member of subfamily Gasterochismatinae.

Scombrids have two dorsal fins and a series of finlets behind the rear dorsal fin and anal fin. The caudal fin is strongly divided and rigid, with a slender, ridged base. The first (spiny) dorsal fin and the pelvic fins are normally retracted into body grooves.

Scombrids are generally predators of the open ocean, and are found worldwide in tropical and temperate waters. They are capable of considerable speed, due to a highly streamlined body and retractable fins. Some members of the family, in particular the tunas, are notable for being partially endothermic (warm-blooded), a feature that also helps them to maintain high speed and activity. Other adaptations include a large amount of red muscle, allowing them to maintain activity over long periods. Scombrids like the yellowfin tuna can reach speeds of 22 km/hr (14 mph).

Classification
Jordan, Evermann and Clark (1930) divide these fishes into the four families: Cybiidae, Katsuwonidae, Scombridae, and Thunnidae, but taxonomists later classified them all into a single family, the Scombridae.

The World Wildlife Fund and the Zoological Society of London jointly issued their "Living Blue Planet Report" on 16 September 2015 which states that a dramatic fall of 74% occurred in worldwide stocks of scombridae fish between 1970 and 2010, and the global overall "population sizes of mammals, birds, reptiles, amphibians and fish fell by half on average in just 40 years".

The 51 extant species are in 15 genera and two subfamilies – with the subfamily Scombrinae further grouped into four tribes, as:

Family Scombridae
 Subfamily Gasterochismatinae
 Genus Gasterochisma
 Subfamily Scombrinae
 Tribe Scombrini – mackerels
 Genus Rastrelliger
 Genus Scomber
 Tribe Scomberomorini – Spanish mackerels
 Genus Acanthocybium
 Genus Grammatorcynus
 Genus Orcynopsis
 Genus Scomberomorus
 Tribe Sardini – bonitos
 Genus Sarda
 Genus Cybiosarda
 Genus Gymnosarda
 Tribe Thunnini – tunas
 Genus Allothunnus
 Genus Auxis
 Genus Euthynnus
 Genus Katsuwonus
 Genus Thunnus

See also
 Scombroid food poisoning

References

External links

 Skaphandrus.com Scombridae

 
Taxa named by Constantine Samuel Rafinesque
Ray-finned fish families